Lupinus meionanthus, commonly known as Lake Tahoe lupine, is a species of flowering plant from the order of Lamiales which can be found in Nevada and California where it can be found in  Yosemite National Park.

References

meionanthus
Flora of California
Flora of Nevada
Flora without expected TNC conservation status